Bache railway station serves the suburbs of Bache and Upton-by-Chester in the north of the city of Chester, England.  It is the first station for Merseyrail services leaving  on the Wirral Line. Passengers can alight here for the Countess of Chester Hospital which is close by, and regular bus services to Chester Zoo.

History
It opened in January 1984 by British Rail in conjunction with a new supermarket being developed by Safeway (now Morrisons) on the site of the former railway coalyard. The modern station has two small covered waiting areas, information boards, CCTV and a footbridge. The platforms are made out of concrete slabs that are laid on brick piles. A remotely operated public address system was installed in January 2012 together with automatic train departure indicators.

This station superseded Upton-by-Chester railway station which was sited  to the north next to Liverpool Road roadbridge. The relocation of the station produced an immediate and dramatic uplift in the number of passengers using it.

Facilities
The station has platform CCTV, a 61-space car park and a cycle rack with 20 spaces and secure cycle storage for 20 bikes. Each platform has a waiting shelter with seating. There are departure and arrival screens, on the platform, for passenger information. There is a payphone, next to the entrance, on platform 1. There is ramp access, to each platform, for passengers with wheelchairs or prams. However, cross-platform access, within the station, is by staircase only. Platform access has not been modernised to the standard of that at Hooton.

Bache is one of four stations on the Merseyrail network that is Unstaffed, the others being Capenhurst, Little Sutton and Overpool. Since Bache became part of the Merseyrail Penalty Fares Area, on 15 June 2009, intending passengers must purchase rail tickets (available to any destination on the UK rail network) from the ticket-vending machine, before boarding a train. This is located on the Liverpool-bound platform.

Services
Trains operate every 15 minutes during the working day from Monday to Saturday southwards towards Chester and northwards towards
Liverpool Lime Street/Liverpool Central via Hooton, Rock Ferry and Birkenhead Central. Later in the evening and on Sundays the service is half-hourly. During the periods of quarter-hourly services alternate trains run through Capenhurst non-stop between Hooton and Bache in each direction. These services are all provided by Merseyrail's fleet of Class 507 and Class 508 EMUs.

Problems
Merseyrail leases Bache railway station car park from Morrisons Supermarket. Rail users' vehicles parked in the supermarket's own parking area because of lack of spaces in the designated Station Car Park are issued penalty tickets. Intending rail passengers who arrive to find the designated Station Car Park full and wish to avoid a penalty ticket as well as staff at and visitors to the nearby Countess of Chester Hospital are creating problems for local residents by leaving their vehicles in adjacent roads and streets.

Gallery

References

Further reading

External links

 Station on navigable O.S. map Bache south of marked Upton station

Railway stations in Cheshire
DfT Category F2 stations
Buildings and structures in Chester
Railway stations in Great Britain opened in 1984
Railway stations opened by British Rail
Railway stations served by Merseyrail